The 2010 Asian Canoe Slalom Championships were the 6th Asian Canoe Slalom Championships and took place from May 1–3, 2010 in Xiasi, China.

Medal summary

Individual

Team

Medal table

References

Official Results

External links
Results

Canoe
Asian Canoe Slalom Championships
Asian Canoeing Championships
International sports competitions hosted by China
Sport in Guizhou
Qiandongnan Miao and Dong Autonomous Prefecture